Portland Public Library is the main library of the public library system in Portland, Maine, USA. It is located at 5 Monument Square on Congress Street in the Old Port of Portland, Maine. The library has three neighborhood branches, Burbank branch (in Deering), Peaks Island branch, and Riverton branch.

History

Portland Athenaeum
The Portland Athenaeum (1826–1876) was a subscription library incorporated in Portland by "Ichabod Nichols, Edward Payson, Albion K. Parris, Prentiss Mellen, William P. Preble, Ashur Ware, Stephen Longfellow, Nicholas Emery, Isaac Adams, Simon Greenleaf, Joseph Adams, William Willis, William B. Sewall, Charles S. Daveis, Robert Ilsley, Andrew L. Emerson, John Mussey, William Swan, Alford Richardson, Barrett Potter, Eliphalet Greely, James C. Churchill, George Warren, Nathaniel Mitchell, Benjamin Willis, Jeremiah Haskell, Oliver Gerrish, Joseph Harrod, Jacob Knight, Henry Smith [and] William Wood."  As gratefully noted in a local newspaper in 1826:

Early supporters included Stephen Longfellow (father of Henry Wadsworth Longfellow), and William Willis. By 1856, the Athenaeum had "160 proprietors and ... a library, in the hall second story of the Canal Bank building [on Middle Street], of 8,500 volumes." James Merrill served as librarian, .

In 1861, the Athenaeum erected a brick building on a lot previously purchased in Plum street. By 1864, the library contained 10,647 bound books, and additional pamphlets.

In 1866, the Great Fire swept through Portland, and the Athenaeum lost its collection in the flames.

Portland Institute and Public Library
In 1867 the Portland Institute and Public Library was formed, with its library located in Portland City Hall. In 1876, the Athenaeum merged into the Portland Institute and Public Library; this bestowed the Atheneum's Plum Street property on the institute, although the library remained at City Hall.

In January 1889, the Portland Institute and Public Library was renamed as Portland Public Library, and became free for readers to access.

Portland Public Library

In 1889, the library moved into what is now known as the Baxter Building, at 619 Congress Street.

The main library moved to Monument Square in 1979. A major renovation of the main building by Scott Simons Architects was completed in 2010.

References

Further reading

External links
 

1867 establishments in Maine
Educational buildings in Portland, Maine
Public libraries in Maine
Education in Portland, Maine
Tourist attractions in Portland, Maine
Libraries in Cumberland County, Maine
Libraries established in 1867
Buildings and structures completed in 1979